Hector Francisco Tanajara Jr. (born December 13, 1996) is an American professional boxer who has held the WBC-USNBC lightweight title since 2019.

Professional career
Tanajara made his professional debut on August 6, 2015, scoring a first-round knockout (KO) victory over Thomas Deleon at the Belasco Theatre in Los Angeles, California.

After compiling a record of 16–0 (5 KOs) he fought for his first professional title, facing Ivan Delgado for the vacant WBC-USNBC lightweight title on February 23, 2019, at the Auditorio Fausto Gutierrez Moreno in Tijuana, Mexico. In a fight which saw Tanajara control the pace at range, he suffered a cut over his left eye in the third round from an accidental clash of heads. Tanajara's corner was able to keep the blood flow at a minimum, however, at the end of the fourth round the ringside doctor recommended the fight be stopped. The referee obliged and waved off the contest, forcing the result to rely on the scorecards for the previous four rounds. Tanajara won every round on all three judges' scorecards with 40–36, capturing the regional WBC title via unanimous technical decision (TD).

Tanajara vs. Gesta cancellation
Tanajara was scheduled to fight Mercito Gesta on the Vergil Ortiz Jr. vs. Samuel Vargas undercard in a 10-round lightweight bout. Gesta pulled out due to food poisoning cancelling the fight.

Professional boxing record

References

External links

Living people
1996 births
Sportspeople from San Antonio
Boxers from Texas
American male boxers
Lightweight boxers